The Massachusetts Fallen Firefighters Memorial is a memorial in Boston's Beacon Hill neighborhood, in the U.S. state of Massachusetts. The memorial was dedicated in 2007, and displayed 870 names, as of September 2014.

References

External links

 Massachusetts Fallen Firefighters Memorial
 Massachusetts Fallen Firefighters Memorial – Boston, MA at Waymarking

2007 establishments in Massachusetts
2007 sculptures
Beacon Hill, Boston
Monuments and memorials in Boston
Outdoor sculptures in Massachusetts
Sculptures of men in Massachusetts
Statues in Boston